Karst-de-Saint-Elzéar Biodiversity Reserve is a biodiversity reserve located in Gaspésie–Îles-de-la-Madeleine, Quebec, Canada, around  north of the town of Saint-Elzéar. It was established on June 20, 2005.

Within the reserve, seven caves have been discovered, although only one of them (grotte de Saint-Elzéar) is open to the public. It is the only reserve to conserve a karst.

The cave is always , whatever the time of year. It is estimated to be around 230,000 years old, making it one of the oldest caves in Quebec.

References

IUCN Category III
Protected areas established in 2005
Protected areas of Gaspésie–Îles-de-la-Madeleine